Param Uppal (born 25 October 1998) is an Australian cricketer of Indian origin. He made his List A debut for Cricket Australia XI in the 2017–18 JLT One-Day Cup on 27 September 2017. He made his first-class debut for New South Wales in the 2017–18 Sheffield Shield season on 3 March 2018.

Early life
Uppal was born in 1998 in Chandigarh, India. He moved with his parents to Australia at the age of four so his mother could train as a teacher.

Domestic career
Uppal was chosen to be part of the Cricket Australia XI squad for the 2017–18 JLT One-Day Cup. He made his List A debut against South Australia in the first match on 27 September, and went on to play all six matches for the tournament, though he only averaged 16.60 with the bat and was unable to take any wickets.
Param Uppal now takes great pride in coaching the UTASCC Under 17s team who are in contention to win both the T20 title and the one day match title.

International career
In December 2017, he was named in Australia's squad for the 2018 Under-19 Cricket World Cup.

References

External links
 

1998 births
Living people
Australian cricketers
Cricket Australia XI cricketers
New South Wales cricketers
Cricketers from Chandigarh
Indian emigrants to Australia